Jack Britto  (16 August 1926 – 16 September 2013) was a Pakistani Olympic field hockey player. Belonging to Karachi's Goan community, he attended Saint Patrick's High School, Karachi where he was one of the star hockey players. He went on to play for the Pakistan national hockey team, where he played right half.

Britto had excellent stick work, was a skilful dribbler and one of the best 'goal shooters' in the game. He later represented Pakistan in the Helsinki Olympics of 1952.

From 1954 onwards Britto played for Malawi. He lived in Wimbledon, UK until his death in 2013. Britto died in London on 15 September 2013.

References

External links

1926 births
Olympic field hockey players of Pakistan
St. Patrick's High School, Karachi alumni
Pakistani male field hockey players
Pakistani Roman Catholics
Pakistani emigrants to the United Kingdom
Malawian people of Goan descent
Malawian sportspeople people of Pakistani descent
2013 deaths
Pakistani people of Goan descent
Field hockey players at the 1952 Summer Olympics
Field hockey players from Karachi
Members of the Order of the British Empire
British people of Goan descent
Malawian sports coaches
Malawian sportsmen
Naturalised citizens of the United Kingdom
Olympic athletes of Pakistan